A by-election was held for the United Kingdom Parliament seat of Birmingham Hodge Hill, on 15 July 2004. The by-election was called following the resignation of Labour Party Member of Parliament (MP), Terry Davis, on 22 June 2004. Davis had been appointed as Secretary General of the Council of Europe. The by-election was held on the same day as the Leicester South by-election, which saw Labour lose the seat to the Liberal Democrats on a 21% swing.

The by-election was won by Labour candidate Liam Byrne, but with a much reduced majority of 460 votes over the Liberal Democrat candidate, Nicola Davies.

Background
Birmingham Hodge Hill has had a Labour MP since the 1950 general election, the only break being a Conservative Party victory at a 1977 by-election for the Birmingham Stechford constituency, which returned to Labour at the 1979 general election.

Campaign
The by-election was heavily contested by the Labour Party and the Liberal Democrats, with both parties alleging "dirty tricks" by the other. Liam Byrne's campaign team, led by West Bromwich East MP Tom Watson, produced leaflets with slogans such as "Labour is on your side, the Lib Dems are on the side of failed asylum seekers." Another flier stated: "While Labour were tough the Lib Dems were wimps—they tried to stop us taking away benefits from failed asylum seekers and they voted against plans to speed up deportations." Meanwhile, the Lib Dems reminded voters of Labour's decision to invade Iraq the previous year and, in the constituency's predominantly Muslim Washwood Heath ward, produced a leaflet carrying a picture of Charles Kennedy and Nicola Davies surrounded by South Asian voters.

During the campaign, Labour pledged to "smash teen gangs" and create "yob-free zones".

Results
At the by-election, the seat was retained by Labour and Liam Byrne became the MP, but with a vastly reduced majority of only 460 votes, with the seat becoming a marginal. The Lib Dems narrowed the gap with a 26.7% swing, which at the time was the eleventh largest in United Kingdom by-election history.

Previous result

Aftermath
The Independents Editorial on 17 July stated: "If the prime minister had hoped for 'closure' on Iraq following the Butler Committee report, the voters of Birmingham and Leicester have told him in no uncertain terms that he won't get it. Of course Iraq and the failure to find WMDs are not the only reasons for the anti-Blair vote so dramatically demonstrated in these two by-elections. The state of public services and local concerns also played a part. Nor should anything detract from the achievement of the Liberal Democrats...The Lib Dem leader, Charles Kennedy, had every right to declare as the results came in that this was 'no flash in the pan' ... The fact is that, in these two votes, as in other recent results, the Lib Dems have shown that they can unseat a ruling Labour majority as much as a Tory one."

The Daily Mirrors Editorial stated: "It isn't often that defeat can leave you smiling, but Tony Blair must have been grinning all over his face [on Friday]. The night before Labour had lost one safe seat to the Lib Dems and only clung on to another by a few hundred votes. Yet what could have been a by-election disaster was not. For it was a catastrophe for [Conservative Party leader] Michael Howard. The Tories crawled in a poor third in both elections ... The voters of Leicester South and Birmingham Hodge Hill confirmed what the polls are saying - the British people have had enough of the Tories."

References

External links
Birmingham City Council's elections office
British Parliamentary By Elections: Campaign literature from the by-election

Hodge Hill
2004 in England
Birmingham Hodge Hill by-election
Birmingham Hodge Hill by-election
Birmingham Hodge Hill by-election